SkyPoint is a 361 ft (110 m) high rise in Tampa, Florida. It was constructed from 2005 to 2007 and has 33 floors. The Preston Partnership, LLC along with Echelon Engineering, LLC designed the building, which is the 9th tallest building in Tampa. It has 380 Residential units spread across 25 levels sitting atop seven levels of enclosed parking. The ground floor houses  of retail space. Separating the parking levels from the residential is a large amenity deck that houses a  clubhouse, a  fitness center, a media room and lounge, as well as a large landscaped terrace and swimming pool. Skypoint is composed of cast-in-place concrete in conjunction with post-tensioned cables. Just before its grand opening to residents, William “Wild Bill” Stroup BASE-jumped off the building on March 6, 2007.

See also
List of tallest buildings in Tampa
 Downtown Tampa

References

Buildings and structures completed in 2007
2007 establishments in Florida
Residential skyscrapers in Tampa, Florida